Tower of Heaven (also rendered as 天国の塔, Tengoku no Tō in Japanese) is a 2D platform game developed by American studio Askiisoft. The game was built in GameMaker, and was released for Microsoft Windows in 2009, with a Flash version released in 2010.

The game was critically acclaimed and noted for its short length and difficulty.

Gameplay 

In Tower of Heaven, the player controls Eid, a silent protagonist with a large, onion-like head, who scales the Tower of Heaven, a mysterious monolith that promises glory to those who scale it. During the journey, a voice assumed to be God talks to Eid, getting angrier the further he climbs. He gives Eid the Book of Laws. The voice imposes more and more laws, and the player dies instantly if any of them are broken.

The game also includes a speedrun mode, where you are timed, and a stage editor mode for the Flash browser version, where you can create and play your own stages.

Development 
Tower of Heaven's soundtrack, composed by FlashyGoodness, and graphical style are heavily influenced by the Game Boy, which was called "sly and deliberately deceptive" to hide the "brutal" difficulty. The game lacks a lives system, and instead uses a timer on each floor to encourage players to continue.

The game was noted by Joseph Leray of video game news website Destructoid to "expose" the "arbitrariness" of long-standing platform game design by giving the Tower an in-universe source and ultimately revealing its design as artificial and in need of destruction.

Reception 
Tower of Heaven received positive reception from critics. Michael Rose of Indiegames.com called the game a "wonderful platformer" despite its difficulty. Joseph Leray of Destructoid called the game's soundtrack "absolutely killer". Fraser McMillan of Gamasutra called the game "almost more liberating" than open world AAA games, due to the fact that it makes quitting the game and the player's quest a perfectly valid option.

Tower of Heaven received a tribute in the form of a playable stage in the 2011 platform fighter Super Smash Land and its 2017 spiritual successor, Rivals of Aether. The stages feature a similar "law" mechanic to Tower of Heaven, where players who do not obey a law while it is active will take damage.

See also 
 Katana Zero

References

External links
 Tower of Heaven at Askiisoft
 Tower of Heaven at MobyGames

2009 video games
Browser games
Indie video games
Flash games
Monochrome video games
Retro-style video games
Windows games
Platform games
GameMaker Studio games
Video games developed in the United States